Rockport Reservoir, also called Wanship Reservoir, is a reservoir along the Weber River within the Rockport State Park in southwestern Summit County, Utah, United States.



Description
Rockport Reservoir is located just south of the town of Wanship on Utah State Route 32. It is an impoundment on the Weber River, created by the Waship Dam.

The reservoir was named for the former town of Rockport, which it almost completely submerged in the 1950s.

Wanship Dam
It was built as part of the Weber Basin project between 1954 and 1957.

State Park
Rockport State Park is a  state park. The park is used for fishing, waterskiing, swimming, and boating on Rockport Reservoir. There are eight campgrounds, featuring a total of 36 RV sites and 86 tent sites. A cross-country skiing trail is available during the winter.

See also

 List of dams and reservoirs in Utah
 List of Utah State Parks

References

External links

   by the Utah Division of Water Quality
 Rockport fishing info on utahfishinginfo.com
 WesternBass.com

Reservoirs in Utah
Lakes of Summit County, Utah
Buildings and structures in Summit County, Utah
State parks of Utah
Protected areas of Summit County, Utah
1950s establishments in Utah